Ryder Matos Santos Pinto (born 27 February 1993) is a Brazilian professional footballer who plays as a winger or forward for  club Perugia.

Club career

Fiorentina 
Born in Seabra, Bahia, Matos was scouted by Fiorentina's sport director Pantaleo Corvino aged 15, while playing for Vitória. He moved to La Viola in 2008, and was promoted to the Primavera squad in 2010.

2012–2013: Loan to Bahia 
On 29 June 2012, Matos moved back to Brazil, joining Vitória's fierce rivals Bahia on loan. Despite being initially assigned to the youth team, he made his debut as a professional on 8 August, coming on as a second-half substitute in a 0–0 home draw against Portuguesa for the Campeonato Brasileiro Série A championship.

Matos was definitely promoted to Bahia's main squad in 2013, and appeared sparingly during the Campeonato Baiano championship, in which his side finished second. He scored his first professional goal on 2 June, netting the first of a 2–1 win against Internacional.

2013–2014: Return to Fiorentina 
Matos returned to Fiorentina in late June 2013, and made his debut for the club on 19 September, in their first match of the group stage of 2013–14 UEFA Europa League against Paços de Ferreira, coming on as a substitute for Joaquín in the 66th minute, and scoring the second of a 3–0 home win. He scored two further goals in the same competition, both against Pandurii Târgu Jiu.

2014: Loan to Córdoba 
On 21 July 2014, Matos moved teams and countries again, joining newly promoted side Córdoba CF in a season-long loan. He made his La Liga debut on 25 August 2014, starting in a 0–2 away loss against Real Madrid.

2015: Loan to Palmeiras 
On 19 January 2015, after being deemed surplus to requirements by new manager Miroslav Đukić, he moved to Palmeiras on loan until December.

2015–2016: Loan to Carpi 
On 8 July 2015, Matos joined Serie A club Carpi on loan until the end of the season.

Udinese 
On 30 January 2016, Matos transferred to Udinese, signing a four-year contract.

2018–2019: Loan to Hellas Verona 
On 10 January 2018, Matos transferred on loan to Hellas Verona from Udinese until 30 June 2018.

2019–2020: Loan to Luzern 
On 29 August 2019, Matos transferred on loan to FC Luzern from Udinese until 2020.

2020–2021: Loan to Empoli 
After making one appearance for Udinese early in the 2020–21 Serie A season, on 4 October 2020 he moved on loan to Serie B club Empoli for the season 2020/21 scoring 7 goals and winning promotion to Serie A with the Tuscan team.

Perugia 
After returning to Udine at the end of the loan, Serie B club AC Perugia signs him a 2-year contract on 31 August 2021.

Career statistics

Club

References

External links
 

1993 births
Living people
Sportspeople from Bahia
Brazilian footballers
Association football wingers
Association football forwards
Serie A players
Serie B players
Campeonato Brasileiro Série A players
La Liga players
Esporte Clube Bahia players
Córdoba CF players
Sociedade Esportiva Palmeiras players
ACF Fiorentina players
A.C. Perugia Calcio players
A.C. Carpi players
Udinese Calcio players
Hellas Verona F.C. players
FC Luzern players
Empoli F.C. players
Brazilian expatriate footballers
Expatriate footballers in Italy
Brazilian expatriate sportspeople in Italy
Expatriate footballers in Spain
Brazilian expatriate sportspeople in Spain
Expatriate footballers in Switzerland
Brazilian expatriate sportspeople in Switzerland